HMS Kingfisher (P260) was a  of the British Royal Navy.

Construction and design
Kingfisher was laid down at the Richard Dunston shipyard at Hessle, near Kingston upon Hull in July 1973, was launched on 20 September 1974 and commissioned on 8 October 1975.

Service
In 1978, Kingfisher and sister ship  were deployed on Operation Grenada, the Royal Navy's standing patrol off the coast of Northern Ireland to stop arms smuggling to paramilitary groups during the Troubles. Kingfisher continued her patrol duties as part of the Northern Ireland Squadron through the 1980s and into the 1990s.

References

 

Bird-class patrol vessels
1974 ships